Nathan Dean Parsons (born 16 June 1988) is an Australian-born American actor, known for his work in daytime television on the ABC daytime soap opera General Hospital as the character of Ethan Lovett. He also had roles on primetime television shows as vampire James Kent on the seventh and final season of the HBO drama series True Blood, and the role of exiled werewolf Jackson Kenner on The CW drama series The Originals. Recently, he has been on Once Upon a Time as Hansel/Jack/Nick Branson and is currently portraying the lead of Max Evans in The CW series Roswell, New Mexico.

Early life and education
Nathan Parsons was born in Adelaide, South Australia, but raised in Boulder, Colorado, and Austin, Texas. He moved to Los Angeles to attend the University of Southern California after being accepted into their Bachelor of Fine Arts Acting program, but dropped out after three semesters. He is also a member of Boom Kat Dance Theatre, a non-profit dance company based in Santa Monica, California. Currently, in their third year, Boom Kat has been made a resident company of the Miles Memorial Playhouse in Santa Monica following the success of their third production NeverWonderland. In his spare time, Parsons enjoys dance, rock climbing, hiking, lacrosse, football, soccer, yoga, and scuba diving.

Career

Early works
As a child actor, he did voice-over work dubbing Japanese anime for ADV Films, including the lead role of Jean Roque-Raltique in Nadia: The Secret of Blue Water and parts in "Soul Hunter", Devil Lady and Jing: King of Bandits. Parsons has previously appeared in the films Teeth (2007) and The Brotherhood V: Alumni (2009).

General Hospital
Parsons originally auditioned for a different role on General Hospital and was not cast, but the series subsequently created a new character for him. He made his first appearance as con artist Ethan Lovett on 30 January 2009. Parsons was initially hired on a recurring basis but was soon put on contract with the series, working closely with multi-Daytime Emmy Award-winner Anthony Geary. Parsons's debut storyline hinted at the secret parentage of his character Ethan, who was later established as the son of Luke Spencer (Geary) and Holly Sutton (Emma Samms), characters made household names during General Hospital 1980s peak. In March 2009 Soaps In Depth magazine credited Parsons with "taking the show by storm" and dubbed Ethan "one of daytime's most riveting young characters."

In December 2011, Parsons announced that he had decided not to renew his contract with General Hospital (which was expiring in early 2012). His last airdate was 7 March 2012, in a final scene that was shared with his on-screen parents, Anthony Geary and Emma Samms. The storyline was left open-ended for his possible return.

In May 2012, Parsons was nominated for a Daytime Emmy Award in the Outstanding Younger Actor category for his portrayal of Ethan Lovett on General Hospital. The 2012 Daytime Emmy Awards were televised live on 23 June 2012, from the Beverly Hilton Hotel in Beverly Hills, California. Though Parsons did not win in this category, he was prominently featured in the telecast as a presenter for the coveted Outstanding Lead Actor category, in which his former co-stars, Anthony Geary and Maurice Benard, were both nominated. Parsons presented the award to his former on-screen father, Anthony Geary (for an unprecedented 7th win), and was acknowledged in Geary's acceptance speech. General Hospital also won the Outstanding Drama Series award.

In April 2013, Parsons returned to General Hospital as Ethan Lovett as part of the show's 50th Anniversary Celebration. His return aired over two days, 2 and 3 April, in which he appeared with Anthony Geary (Luke Spencer), Genie Francis (Laura Spencer) and Constance Towers (Helena Cassadine). He also reprised his character again in July 2015 for two episodes.

Bunheads
Parsons debuted on Bunheads on 16 July 2012, in an episode entitled "Money for Nothing", which introduced his character of Godot. While Godot was well known and idolized by the "bunheads", the lead character of Michelle (Sutton Foster) had never met him, as he had only just returned from a year-long surfing trip. There was a brief, but instant rapport between Michelle and Godot; a relationship that was played out through season 1. He went on to appear in another six episodes through the show's first and only season.

2014 to present
Parsons replaced Luke Grimes as James in the final season of True Blood and appeared on The Originals as Jackson Kenner from 2014 to 2018.

In March 2018, Parsons was cast as Max Evans in The CW series Roswell, New Mexico.

Filmography

Film

Television

Awards

References

External links

Nathan Parsons biography – ABC.com

1988 births
Living people
American male soap opera actors
American male television actors
Male actors from Colorado
People with acquired American citizenship
Australian male soap opera actors
Male actors from Adelaide
USC School of Cinematic Arts alumni
Australian emigrants to the United States
21st-century American male actors